Lavandula pedunculata, commonly called French lavender, is a species of flowering plant in the family Lamiaceae. It is known for its butterfly-like, narrow petals that emerge from the top of its narrow stalk. L. pedunculata is native to Iberia, Morocco and western Turkey. 

There are five subspecies of L. pedunculata:

 Lavandula pedunculata subsp. atlantica (Braun-Blanq.) Romo
 Lavandula pedunculata subsp. cariensis (Boiss.) Upson & S.Andrews
 Lavandula pedunculata subsp. lusitanica (Chaytor) Franco
 Lavandula pedunculata subsp. pedunculata
 Lavandula pedunculata subsp. sampaiana (Rozeira) Franco

References

pedunculata
Flora of the Mediterranean Basin